The 2018 PGA Tour of Australasia, titled as the 2018 ISPS Handa PGA Tour of Australasia for sponsorship reasons, was a series of men's professional golf events played mainly in Australia. The main tournaments on the PGA Tour of Australasia were played in the southern summer, so they were split between the first and last months of the year.

Schedule
The following table lists official events during the 2018 season.

Order of Merit
The Order of Merit was based on prize money won during the season, calculated in Australian dollars. The leading player on the tour (not otherwise exempt) earned status to play on the 2019 European Tour.

Awards

Notes

References

External links

PGA Tour of Australasia
Australasia
PGA Tour of Australasia
PGA Tour of Australasia